Shaun Connor is a former Wales 7s international rugby union player and current backs coach of the Russian National Team. He was part of the Ospreys team that defeated Australia, where he played a crucial role and was named Man of the Match. He has previously played for the Ospreys, being the first back to make 100 appearances for the club, and the Dragons. After retiring he went on to coach the Ospreys Under 20s and also worked with the Dragons as backs coach.

Rugby Union career

Amateur career

Connor played for Abertillery RFC, Ebbw Vale RFC, Newport RFC and also Neath RFC and Pontypool.

Professional career

Connor played for the Ospreys. A fly half, he scored a total of 456 points for the Ospreys and was influential in their historic 24–16 win against Australia at the Liberty Stadium.

In April 2008 it was announced Connor would join Newport Gwent Dragons for the new season on a two-year contract. He was released at the end of the 2009–10 season.

International career

He has never had a full senior cap for the Wales national rugby union team but was reported to be on Gareth Jenkins 2006 Rugby World Cup standby list alongside another ex Ebbw Vale and Newport fly half Jason Strange.

References

External links
Newport Gwent Dragons profile
Ospreys profile

1975 births
Living people
Dragons RFC players
Newport RFC players
Ospreys (rugby union) players
Rugby union players from Panteg
Welsh rugby union players
Rugby union fly-halves